Cornel Emilian Georgescu (born 13 June 1955 – 18 May 2020) was a Romanian professional footballer and manager. Georgescu grew up at Minerul Bihor, but played all his senior career for FC Bihor Oradea, club for which he is the record holder in all-time most appearances rankings, with 347 matches played at the level of Divizia A and Divizia B. He is also the all-time top scorer of "the red and blues", with 96 goals.

In the top-flight, Georgescu played in 205 matches and scored 31 goals. After retirement, he worked for a period as an assistant manager and as a coach in the youth academy of FC Bihor Oradea.

Honours
Bihor Oradea
Divizia B: 1974–75, 1981–82, 1987–88

References

1955 births
2020 deaths
Sportspeople from Cluj-Napoca
Romanian footballers
Association football midfielders
Liga I players
Liga II players
FC Bihor Oradea players